Season 2002-03 saw Livingston compete in the Scottish Premier League. They also competed in the UEFA Cup, League Cup and the Scottish Cup.

Summary
Livingston competed in Europe for the first time in their history during season 2002–03 reaching the first round of the Uefa Cup. They finished 9th in the Scottish Premier League, reached the Quarter finals of the Scottish Cup and were knocked out by Dunfermline in the third round of the Co-operative Insurance Cup after a replay.

Results & fixtures

Spl

UEFA Cup

League Cup

Scottish Cup

Statistics

League table

References

Livingston
Livingston F.C. seasons